Qinghu North station is a station on Line 4 of the Shenzhen Metro. It opened on 28 October 2020.

Station layout

Exits

References

Railway stations in Guangdong
Shenzhen Metro stations
Longhua District, Shenzhen
Railway stations in China opened in 2020